"Sheila Ki Jawani" is an Indian Hindi-language song sung by Sunidhi Chauhan and Vishal Dadlani featuring Katrina Kaif along with Akshay Kumar in the 2010 Bollywood film Tees Maar Khan. The music is composed by composer duo Vishal–Shekhar and the lyrics are penned by Dadlani. The moves were choreographed by choreographer-director Farah Khan, who went on to win the Filmfare award for best choreography for the movie.

The immense popularity of the song prompted many comparisons between the song and "Munni Badnaam Hui", from the 2010 movie Dabangg. It has since become one of the most viewed Bollywood songs on YouTube with more than 200 million views to date.

Influences
Katrina Kaif stated that Farah Khan presented her with DVDs of Madhuri Dixit's movies, so that Katrina could concentrate on Dixit's dances. Kaif then stated that it helped her a lot. Kaif describes her performance in this song as "one of the sexiest" she has ever done. She said, "It was kind of a learning experience for me. I don't take the song being called item number as an offense. There is exposure in the song but it is more about attitude and I was specific about it..." Director Farah Khan recalls, "Katrina was very conscious of revealing her navel in Sheila ki Jawani and worked out for two months for it, telling me to allow her an option to cover herself with a dupatta if her abs weren't flat. But in the end, she was extremely confident, not bothering to cover up with a bathrobe in between shots or even in the walk from her vanity van to the set."

Music video 
Both the official music video and the full video feature Kaif shooting for an eponymous film with Dadlani as director in a special appearance. Kumar and his gang, comprising Ali Asgar, Dharampal and Vijay Maurya, then interrupt the music video shoot twice, only to be dragged away by security.

The extended video cut ends with Kumar smashing director Dadlani's head with a mug and carrying away Kaif on his shoulders as the background dancers scatter in a frenzy. Kumar is shown to detest the shoot and tries to distract Kaif, annoying director Dadlani in the bargain.

Reception

The song was well received by film critics, who praised the choreography of Farah Khan and the moves of Katrina. Anupama Chopra of NDTV wrote, "Farah continues to be the consummate choreographer – So, Sheila ki Jawani has a superb, infectious energy". Nikhat Kazmi of the Times of India wrote "Of course Sheila Ki Jawani is eye-popping chartbuster fare and adds another definition to the item number with Katrina's explosive rendition". India Today wrote "The stunning Katrina Kaif brings sexy back with her latest item song from Farah Khan's Tees Maar Khan." CNX.org wrote, "The sizzling hot number performed by the steaming Katrina Kaif is a mix of outstanding talent and crude sexual appeal. Undoubtedly, the choreographer Farah Khan has an uncanny talent to bring out the best of sari. She would remind you 'Who says that sari is not a sexy outfit?'" bollykings.com wrote, "This song can safely be called the sexiest, raunchiest, hottest eye popping dance number after, well, Beedi and Munni Badnaam. Sheila Ki Jawaani successfully establishes Katrina Kaif as an established item girl in Bollywood for she has pulled the act off with grace and sexiness at the same time. Nothing cheap, just pure oomph!" The Times of India, praising Katrina in item songs, wrote, "Katrina Kaif made men go weak on their knees with her navel exposure for the item songs, 'Sheila ki Jawani' and 'Chikni Chameli' which were major hits in her career."

The song turned out to be one of the biggest hits of the year, along with "Munni Badnaam Hui" from Dabangg. Malaika Arora Khan, who featured in "Munni badnaam hui" was frequently compared with Kaif, in what was popularly known as the "Munni vs Sheila" debate.

Controversy
In December 2010, a Public Interest Litigation (PIL) was filed in the Lucknow bench of the Allahabad High Court, with the petitioner asking for a ban of the song, claiming it was "indecent" and "immoral". However, the movie was released with minimal cuts, and was given a U/A censor rating.

Accolades

Awards and nominations

IIFA Awards
Nominated
 IIFA Best Female Playback - Sunidhi Chauhan for Sheila Ki Jawani

Zee Cine Awards

Won
Zee Cine Award for Best Choreography Award - Farah Khan for "Sheila Ki Jawani"

Nominated
Zee Cine Award for Best Track of the Year - "Sheila Ki Jawani"
Zee Cine Award for Best Music Director - Vishal / Shekhar
Zee Cine Award for Best Playback Singer - Female - Sunidhi Chauhan for "Sheila Ki Jawani"
Zee Cine Award for Best Lyricist - Vishal Dadlani for "Sheila Ki Jawani"

Filmfare Awards
Won
Filmfare Best Playback Singer - Female - Sunidhi Chauhan for Sheila Ki Jawani
Filmfare Best Choreography Award - Farah Khan for Sheila Ki Jawani

Star Screen Awards
Nominated
Screen Award for Best Female Playback for Sheila Ki Jawani (Sunidhi Chauhan)

Apsara Film & Television Producers Guild Awards
Won
Best Female Playback Singer for - Sheila Ki Jawani - Sunidhi Chauhan

Mirchi Music Awards
Won
Listeners' Choice Song of the Year for "Sheila Ki Jawani"
Nominated
 Song of The Year for "Sheila Ki Jawani"
 Female Vocalist of The Year - Sunidhi Chauhan for "Sheila Ki Jawani"
 Best Item Song of the Year for "Sheila Ki Jawani"

Other Awards
Won
 GIMA award Best Female playback for Sheila Ki Jawani - Sunidhi Chauhan
 Airtel Dancing Super Star for Sheila Ki Jawani - Katrina Kaif

References

2010 songs
Hindi film songs
Pop-folk songs
Indian songs
Songs with music by Vishal–Shekhar
Sunidhi Chauhan songs